Assimilatory nitrate reductase may refer to:
 Nitrate reductase (NADH)
 Nitrate reductase (NAD(P)H)
 Nitrate reductase (NADPH)
 Nitrite reductase